Shemford School is an English medium Co-educational day school located in Haldwani, Uttarakhand.

Shemford School was established on 30 March 2016. It is a unit of Shemrock and Shemford Group of Schools and also a unit of Shri Krishnanand J.D. Educational Society. It has a large campus of 3 acres and more than 35 teachers. Mrs. Madhavi Bisht is the Founder director of the School.

Affiliation & Certification
The school is affiliated to the Central Board of Secondary Education, New Delhi

Academics

Core subjects include
English,
Hindi,
Mathematics,
Science,
Social Studies,
EVS,
Sanskrit,
Music 
Game

Facilities

Junior Wing

Activity Centre
Multipurpose Lab
Art and Craft Station
Theatre Room
Music and Dance Studio

Senior Wing

Ultra-modern Interactive Classrooms
Library
Science Lab
Social Science Lab
Mathematics Lab
Outdoor and Indoor Play Area

References

Primary schools in India
High schools and secondary schools in Uttarakhand
Haldwani
Educational institutions established in 2016
2016 establishments in Uttarakhand